The Violet Flame is the sixteenth studio album by English synth-pop duo Erasure, released by Mute Records on 22 September 2014 in the United Kingdom and on 23 September 2014 in North America.

Overview
The album contains original tracks written by band members Vince Clarke and Andy Bell, and is produced by Erasure and Richard X.  The tracks were composed on synthesizers, rather than guitar and piano; a first for the duo.

The single, "Elevation", was released as a prelude to the album, with a coinciding world tour. A subsequent single, "Reason", was released on 24 November 2014, with new track "Die 4 Love" as the B-side, and a third single "Sacred" on 16 March 2015

The track listing for The Violet Flame was revealed on 18 July 2014.

On 28 September, the album charted at number 20 on the UK Albums Chart, becoming the duo's first top-20 album since Other People's Songs (2003). In the United States, the album entered the Billboard 200 at number 48, giving Erasure their first top-50 album since Cowboy (1997), while peaking at number two on the US Dance/Electronic Albums chart.

Track listing
The Violet Flame was released as a standard CD, a deluxe 2-CD, a digital download, a double album in a gatefold sleeve (featuring The Violet Flame on violet vinyl on one disc and six remixes on white vinyl on the other, via PledgeMusic with more than 500 pre-orders), and a limited edition 3-CD box set which includes the original album as well as additional material.

Charts

References

2014 albums
Albums produced by Richard X
Erasure albums
Mute Records albums